Bathynectes muelleri is an extinct species of polybiid crab and the oldest known species of the genus Bathynectes. It lived in the Central Paratethys of modern-day Ukraine during the Badenian age(Langhian, middle Miocene ).  While extant species of Bathynectes live mainly in deep water habitats, B. muelleri fossils were found in sediments indicative of shallow water habitats, suggesting the earliest Bathynectes originated in shallow waters, and descendent species migrated to deep-water habitats.

References

Portunoidea
Miocene crustaceans
Fossil taxa described in 2011
Prehistoric life of Europe